Govora may refer to several places in Romania:

Places 

 Băile Govora, a town and a spa in Vâlcea County
 Govora, a village in Bobicești Commune, Olt County
 Govora, a village in Mihăești Commune, Vâlcea County

Monastery 

 Govora Monastery  - Mănăstirea Govora, one of the oldest monasteries from Țara Românească

River 

 Govora (river), right tributary of the river Olt in Vâlcea County